Kerrytown or Kerry Town may refer to:

 Kerry Town, a village in Sierra Leone and location of an Ebola treatment center
 Kerrytown, Ann Arbor, a historic district in Ann Arbor, Michigan
 Kerrytown, New Zealand, a rural community in New Zealand